Doisy may refer to:

People:
Edward Adelbert Doisy (1893–1986), American biochemist, Nobel laureate

In wine:
Château Doisy Daëne, Bordeaux wine producer of Sauternes
Château Doisy-Dubroca, Bordeaux wine producer of Sauternes
Château Doisy-Védrines, Bordeaux wine producer of Sauternes